Spilarctia bisecta is a moth in the family Erebidae. It was described by John Henry Leech in 1889. It is found in China (Shanghai, Hong Kong, Sichuan, Jiangxi, Shandong, Jiangsu, Zhejiang, Hubei, Hunan, Fujian, Guangdong, Guangxi, Guizhou, Yunnan, Tibet).

Subspecies
 Spilarctia bisecta bisecta (southern China)
 Spilarctia bisecta occidentalis (Rothschild, 1914) (China: Tibet)

References

Moths described in 1889
bisecta